Springleaf MRT station is an underground Mass Rapid Transit (MRT) station on the Thomson–East Coast line (TEL) in Singapore. Situated along Upper Thomson Road, it serves the neighbourhood of Springleaf and the nearby Springleaf Nature Park. It will also serve future housing developments in the Springleaf area. The station is operated by SMRT Trains.

First announced in August 2012 as part of the Thomson line (TSL), the station was constructed as part of TEL Phase 2 (TEL 2) after plans for the TSL and the Eastern Region line (ERL) were merged. The station was built close to the shophouses along Upper Thomson Road. An earth retaining stabilising structure was installed to minimise ground movement. Along with the TEL 2 stations, Springleaf station opened on 28 August 2021 and features an Art-in-Transit artwork Tree of Memories by Koh Hong Teng.

History

The station was first announced as part of the 22-station Thomson line (TSL) on 29 August 2012. The station's construction began in 2014, with a scheduled completion date of 2020.

Another contract for the construction of bored tunnels from Seletar Expressway to Springleaf station (alongside other facilities) was awarded to Shimizu Corporation at a sum of S$189.8 million (US$ million) in January 2014. On 15 August 2014, the LTA further announced that the TSL would merge with the Eastern Region line to form the Thomson–East Coast line (TEL). Springleaf station, part of the proposed line, would be constructed as part of TEL 2, consisting of six stations between this station and Caldecott.

To minimise ground movement and any damage to the shophouses, cement was mixed into the ground while an earth-retaining stabilising structure was installed to strengthen the soil. Cranes and heavy machinery had to be carefully installed, with restricted movements to avoid endangering the shophouses and patrons. Barriers were installed to minimise noise pollution, and workers draped noise curtains on heavy machinery. Meanwhile, the LTA collaborated closely with a power supplier PowerGrid to construct a cable tunnel through the station.

With restrictions imposed on construction due to the COVID-19 pandemic, the TEL 2 completion date was pushed to 2021. On 14 December 2020, it was further announced that the opening of TEL 2 was delayed to the third quarter of 2021 so the rail system software for the line could be reviewed. As announced during a visit by Transport Minister S. Iswaran at Caldecott station on 30 June 2021, the station began operations on 28 August 2021.

Details
Springleaf station serves the TEL of the Singapore MRT system. Between the Woodlands South and Lentor stations, the official station code is TE4. Being part of the TEL, the station is operated by SMRT Trains; train frequencies on the TEL range from 5 to 9 minutes.

The station has three entrances that serve the Springleaf Nature Park, Thong Soon residential estate and the shophouses along Upper Thomson Road. The station will also serve future housing developments in the area. The Art-in-Transit artwork for the station Tree of Memories is displayed on the station's lift shaft. The artwork depicts shophouses in the vicinity enveloped by a banyan tree that can be seen at the nearby Springleaf Nature Park, intended to illustrate the "spatial connection" between people and nature.

References

External links
 

Mass Rapid Transit (Singapore) stations
Railway stations in Singapore opened in 2021